Dame Victoria Madeleine Sharp, PC (born 8 February 1956) is the President of the King's Bench Division of the High Court of Justice in England and Wales.

Early life

She is the daughter of Lord Sharp of Grimsdyke. Her twin brother is Richard Sharp, a former Goldman Sachs banker, and Chairman of the BBC from February 2021.  She is Jewish. She was educated at North London Collegiate School and the University of Bristol.

Career

Sharp was called to the Bar, Inner Temple in 1979. She became a Recorder in 1998, and a QC in 2001.

She was appointed Dame Commander of the Order of the British Empire (DBE), as is customary, on her appointment as a Justice of the High Court on 13 January 2009.

She was Presiding Judge of the Western Circuit from 2012 to 2013, and was appointed a Lady Justice of Appeal in 2013. She became Vice-President of the Queen's Bench Division on 1 January 2016, succeeding Sir Nigel Davis. She became President of the Queen's Bench Division from 23 June 2019 succeeding Sir Brian Leveson.

Personal life

Sharp married a doctor; she had four children within five years. Nevertheless, she remained in full-time law practice during those years, not taking leave. "She was convinced that if she had not dedicated herself to her job as she did by rejecting any leave on the birth of any of her children, she would have been significantly disadvantaged; as she puts it, if you were not there in Chambers, you did not receive briefs and you had no job."

References

1956 births
Living people
Alumni of the University of Bristol
English King's Counsel
English women judges
Dames Commander of the Order of the British Empire
Daughters of life peers
Queen's Bench Division judges
21st-century King's Counsel
Place of birth missing (living people)
People educated at North London Collegiate School
Lady Justices of Appeal
Members of the Privy Council of the United Kingdom